Mora Point, on the Mahaicony River in the Mahaica-Berbice Region of Guyana, is a village located 18 km south of the East Coast Highway.

It is an important settlement as the jurisdiction of its Police Outpost extends to almost the entire river.

Mainly a rice-producing village it also houses the pumping station responsible for irrigation of the rice fields in the area.

Mora Point contains a Health Centre, Karamat Primary School and Mora Point Nursery School.

References

Populated places in Mahaica-Berbice